Warren William "Hick" Carpenter (August 16, 1855 – April 18, 1937) was an American third baseman who played with several major league teams from 1879 to 1892.

Career
Carpenter was born in Grafton, Massachusetts, in 1855. He started his professional baseball career in 1877 and made his MLB debut in the National League in 1879.

In the winter of 1879–1880, Carpenter and Jimmy Macullar became the first North Americans to play in the Cuban League. They were signed by the Colón club and were so powerful that other teams refused to play against them.

Carpenter played in the NL in 1880 and 1881. He then joined the American Association's Cincinnati Red Stockings and spent the rest of the decade on that team.

In 1882, Carpenter led the AA with 120 hits and 67 runs batted in. On September 12, 1883, he collected six hits in a game, as Cincinnati beat the Pittsburgh Alleghenys 27–5 while collecting a club-record 33 hits. On July 1, 1884, he had 5 hits, including 2 home runs and 2 doubles to lead the Red Stockings to a 16–5 win over the Washington Nationals.

Carpenter left Cincinnati and played mostly in the minor leagues from 1890 to 1892. He played one MLB game in 1892, which was his last season in professional baseball.

In Carpenter's old age, he renewed his friendship with the legendary Reds player Bid McPhee.  They often fished together and attended San Diego Padres games in the Pacific Coast League.

Carpenter died in San Diego, California, in 1937. He is interred at Mount Hope Cemetery. A grave marker was provided in 2022 by SABR.

See also
List of Major League Baseball annual runs batted in leaders
List of Major League Baseball single-game hits leaders

References

External links

1855 births
1937 deaths
19th-century baseball players
Major League Baseball third basemen
Syracuse Stars (NL) players
Cincinnati Reds (1876–1879) players
Worcester Ruby Legs players
Cincinnati Red Stockings (AA) players
St. Louis Browns (NL) players
Syracuse Stars (minor league baseball) players
Kansas City Blues (baseball) players
Indianapolis Hoosiers (minor league) players
Baseball players from Massachusetts
People from Grafton, Massachusetts
Burials at Mount Hope Cemetery (San Diego)
Sportspeople from Worcester County, Massachusetts